Chief of Staff to the Prime Minister may refer to:

 Chief of Staff to the Prime Minister (Australia)
 Chief of Staff to the Prime Minister (Canada)
 Chief of Staff to the Prime Minister (Latvia)
 Chief of Staff to the Prime Minister (Malta)
 Downing Street Chief of Staff, in the United Kingdom